Footloose! is an album led by jazz pianist Paul Bley featuring tracks recorded in 1962 & 1963 and released on the Savoy label. Tracks from this album, along with alternate takes and addition material from the sessions, were later released as Syndrome and Floater.

Reception

Allmusic described it as "one of Bley's most enjoyable albums". Rough Guide author Ian Carr calls the album "classic and highly influential" stating that the "quiet, focused intensity persists throughout." Fellow pianist Keith Jarrett said he listened to the album "thousands of times."

Track listing
All compositions by Paul Bley, except as indicated
 "When Will The Blues Leave" (Ornette Coleman) - 6:08  
 "Floater" (Carla Bley) - 6:23  
 "Turns" - 3:14  
 "Around Again" (Carla Bley) - 4:04  
 "Syndrome" (Carla Bley) - 7:07  
 "Cousins" - 4:39  
 "King Korn" (Carla Bley) - 3:57  
 "Vashkar" (Carla Bley) - 4:06

Alternate releases
Floater: 

This 1984 album included tracks 1-4 and added the following tracks recorded at the same sessions:
"Stereophrenic" (David Baker) - 5:06 (Note: some editions misspell title as "Stereophonic", and mistakenly credit Paul Bley as composer. This composition was previously recorded for George Russell's The Stratus Seekers).
"Circle with the Hole in the Middle" (Coleman) - 5:08
"Ballad No. 4" - 4:50
Syndrome:

This 1986 album included tracks 5-8 and added the following tracks recorded at the same sessions:
 "Around Again" [alternate take] (Carla Bley) - 3:53  
 "Ballad I" - 4:29  
 "King Korn" [alternate take] (Carla Bley) - 4:17  
 "Ballad II" - 3:47

Personnel 
Paul Bley - piano
Steve Swallow - bass  
Pete LaRoca - drums

References 

1963 albums
Paul Bley albums
Savoy Records albums